Eric Small is a television and film producer, writer and director of different movies and the TV Series Penn & Teller: Bullshit! (2003).

Short biography
Small's first writing project, Blue Blazes was awarded the Gold Medal for Best Screenplay at Worldfest, Houston's International Film Competition. Small's film credits include Maximum Risk and Rubicon. He is married to American television and film actress Kim Myers. Eric made his directorial debut with the film The Dust Factory which had a small part played by his wife Kim Myers.

Directing filmography
The Dust Factory (2004)

Writing filmography
Code Red (2001)
The Dust Factory (2004)

Miscellaneous filmography
Illegally Yours (1988) - production assistant to Director Peter Bogdanovich

External links

Living people
American film producers
American television producers
American film directors
Year of birth missing (living people)